Infinity is the third solo album by Canadian musician Devin Townsend, and the first released under his real name. The album was released in October 1998 on Townsend's label, HevyDevy Records.

Background
After the completion of Strapping Young Lad's extreme metal album City and his solo progressive rock release Ocean Machine: Biomech, Townsend began to approach a mental breakdown. "I started to see human beings as little lonesome, water based, pink meat," he explained, "life forms pushing air through themselves and making noises that the other little pieces of meat seemed to understand." In 1997, he checked himself into a mental-health hospital, where he was diagnosed with bipolar disorder. The diagnosis helped him understand where the two sides of his music were coming from; he felt his disorder "gave birth to the two extremes that are Strapping's City record and Ocean Machine's Biomech."

After being discharged from the hospital, Townsend found that "everything just clicked" and he was able to write his third solo album, Infinity, which he described as "the parent project" of City and Biomech. Townsend returned to the studio, accompanied by drummer Gene Hoglan, to work on the album, on which Townsend played most of the instruments. During the recording sessions, Devin slept on the studio floor. Devin has claimed Infinity was partly inspired by experimentation with LSD and other psychedelic drugs.

A music video was made for the song "Christeen".

Music 
The first two minutes of the track "OM" have occasionally been played live as an intro of sorts to other songs, and were demoed for inclusion on Addicted (later appearing on Contain Us). The "Infinite Waltz" section of "Processional" was later used as the outro to "The Mighty Masturbator" from Deconstruction. The track "Truth" was re-recorded for Transcendence, the seventh studio album by the Devin Townsend Project. "OM" was played live in its entirety in 2017 at the Ancient Roman Theater in Plovdiv. The entirety of the album was played in sequence, along with outtakes Om, Sit in the Mountain, and Processional, in a ticketed live stream concert on February 5 2022 as part of the Quarantine Concert Series.

Release
Infinity was released in October 1998 on Townsend's independent label, HevyDevy Records. It was distributed in Canada by HevyDevy, in Japan by Sony, and in Europe initially by USG Records and later on by InsideOut and with three bonus tracks.

Track listing
The InsideOut release of Infinity had different titles for several tracks; these are listed in parentheses. The InsideOut release of Infinity also contained three bonus tracks.

The original track listing intended for Infinity was different from its final release. Due to the record label's time restraints, Townsend could not finish some of the tracks. These were later included on the Christeen + Four Demos EP. The original track list was:

Personnel

Music
 Devin Townsend – vocals, guitar, bass, keyboards, programming
 Gene Hoglan – drums
 Christian Olde Wolbers – upright bass
 Andy Codrington – trombone
 Erin Townsend, Lyn Townsend, Dave Townsend, Naomi, Tanya Evans, Lara Uthoff, Chris Valagao, Brad Jackson, Jennifer Lewis – additional vocals
 Jamie Meyer - piano solo (track 3)

Production
 Devin Townsend – production, recording, engineering, mixing, digital editing, digital assembly
 Mark Gordon – bass engineering
 Matteo Caratozzolo – assistance, digital editing
 Mark Gordon – assistance
 Byron Stroud – assistance
 Marty Schwartz – assistance
 Ross Gale – assistance
 Ramon Donati – assistance
 Scott Ternan – assistance
 Pete Wonsiak – mixing, additional recording
 Matteo Caratozzolo – additional recording
 Jennifer Lewis – digital editing
 Jamie Meyer – digital assembly
 Brett Anthony – digital assembly
 Greg Reely – mastering
 Tracy Turner – management

Artwork
 Mille Thorsen – layout and design
 Aaron Mason – photography

Chart performance

References

External links
 Infinity (HevyDevy Records)
 Infinity (InsideOut Music)

Devin Townsend albums
1998 albums
Inside Out Music albums
Albums produced by Devin Townsend